Captain Sir Bede Edmund Hugh Clifford  (3 July 1890 – 6 October 1969) was a British diplomat and colonial administrator, born in New Zealand, where his parents had moved in an unsuccessful attempt at sheep-farming.

His parents were William Hugh Clifford, 10th Baron Clifford of Chudleigh and Catherine Mary Bassett. After New Zealand they moved to Tasmania; he did not attend a regular school until he was 10.  He attended Xavier College, Melbourne where he was a gifted student. This was followed by study at Melbourne University, becoming a surveyor, then a merchant navy officer.

Career
After serving as an army captain in the Royal Fusiliers during World War I, where he gained the rank of Captain, he worked in imperial administration and diplomacy. From 1917 he was aide-de-camp, then Private Secretary to the Governor-General of Australia, Sir Ronald Ferguson. From 1921 to 1931, he was Secretary to the Governor-General of South Africa, first to Prince Arthur of Connaught and then to Prince Alexander of Teck.

In 1931, it was announced that Clifford would be appointed Governor and Commander-in-Chief of the Bahamas. He was later appointed the 24th Governor of Mauritius from 23 October 1937 to 16 April 1942. He then became Governor of Trinidad and Tobago from 1942 to 1947. and was appointed a Fellow of the Royal Geographical Society.

Family
He married Alice Devin Gundry in 1925 in Cleveland, Ohio.  He retired to England, where he died. They had three daughters:

Anne Frances Mary Clifford, born on 5 January 1929, married John Julius Norwich, 2nd Viscount Norwich. The had two children: The Hon Alice Clifford, later Artemis Cooper, the historian, who married Sir Antony Beevor; and Jason Cooper, 3rd Viscount Norwich
Patricia David Pandora Clifford, born on 29 January 1930, married Timothy Angus Jones, son of Sir Roderick Jones and Enid Bagnold, and was the mother of Annabel Astor, Viscountess Astor and the grandmother of Samantha Cameron, wife of the former Prime Minister of the United Kingdom David Cameron. She later married The Hon Michael Astor, son of Waldorf Astor, 2nd Viscount Astor.
Alice Devin Atalanta Clifford, born on 10 May 1932. She married, Richard Fairey, son of Sir Charles Richard Fairey and Henrietta Queenie Nicholson Markey, on 10 September 1955. She married, secondly, W/Cdr. Timothy Ashmead Vigors, son of Captain Ludlow Ashmead Cliffe Vigors, on 31 October 1963. She and W/Cdr. Timothy Ashmead Vigors were divorced. She married, thirdly, Michael Henry Dennis Madden in 1972.

Honours
Clifford was appointed Member of the Royal Victorian Order (MVO) on 18 August 1920 in recognition of his services in the Royal Fusiliers as Military Secretary to the Governor-General of Australia, which was presented to him by the then Prince of Wales during his visit to Australia. He was then made a Companion of the Order of St Michael and St George (CMG) on 1 January 1924 in recognition of his services as Secretary to the Governor General of South Africa. He was appointed a Companion of the Order of the Bath (CB) on 1 January 1931 in recognition of his services as Imperial Secretary to the South African High Commission and Representative in the Union of South Africa of the UK Government. As Governor and Commander-in-Chief of the Bahama Islands, he was promoted to the rank of Knight Commander of the Order of St Michael and St George (KCMG) on 3 June 1933. On 28th December 1944, he was appointed Knight of the Order of St John (KStJ). He was promoted to the rank of Knight Grand Cross of the Order of St Michael and St George (GCMG) on 1 January 1945. He was also awarded the Legion of Merit by the United States.

References

1890 births
1969 deaths
New Zealand Knights Grand Cross of the Order of St Michael and St George
New Zealand Companions of the Order of the Bath
New Zealand Members of the Royal Victorian Order
Younger sons of barons
New Zealand people of English descent
New Zealand emigrants to Australia
New Zealand emigrants to the United Kingdom
Royal Fusiliers officers
British Army personnel of World War I
University of Melbourne alumni
Governors of Trinidad and Tobago
Governors of British Mauritius
British governors of the Bahamas